The Pukguksong-2 (KN-15 under the U.S. naming convention) is a medium-range or intermediate-range ballistic missile under development by North Korea, which unlike the nation's earlier designs, uses solid fuel. Described as 'nuclear-capable', its first test flight was on 12 February 2017, although two previous launches in October 2016 that were initially thought to be Hwasong-10 were possibly failed launches of the Pukguksong-2 instead. The state-run KCNA news agency said that leader Kim Jong-un supervised the test, which was described as a success.

Analysts have described the new missile as 'more stable, more efficient, and harder to detect' than North Korea's previous liquid-fuelled designs.  In contrast to older, liquid-fueled rockets that take hours to prepare for launch and are easier to detect and counteract by other countries, the Pukguksong-2 is a solid-fuel rocket that can be launched in minutes.

The missile is now deployed in northern North Korea near its border with China in missile bases where the Hwasong-7 is deployed.

Design
The Pukguksong-2 is an enlarged, two stage development of the Pukguksong-1, a submarine-launched ballistic missile (SLBM). The missile is canister launched from its enclosed transport container. It uses a 'cold-launching' system, which starts using compressed gas, followed by the engine igniting in mid-flight. The container is a smooth cylinder inside, without rails, and on launch a series of slipper blocks could be seen to fall away from the missile. These act as bearings while the missile is projected through the close-fitting tube, a system first seen with the US Peacekeeper. A series of grid fins are deployed at the base of the missile to provide aerodynamic stability during flight. The transporter erector launcher (TEL) is a new design, conceptually similar to the Russian 2P19 TEL of the R-17M Elbrus SS-1 Scud-B; fully tracked and claimed to be of indigenous North Korean manufacture, rather than previous Chinese wheeled launchers, derivatives of the ubiquitous MAZ-543 design.

On its first test flight it flew  on a deliberately inefficient trajectory. One unusual feature is the ability of the missile to take images of the ground from near its apogee and transmit them to a receiving station. Continuing to gather imaging data as it enters the atmosphere may be useful for precisely guiding a manoeuvring reentry vehicle, although the Pukguksong-2 has not yet been tested with one.

List of Pukguksong-2 tests

See also 
 RT-15 RT-25 25M RT-15M

References

External links 
CSIS Missile Threat - Pukguksong-2

Ballistic missiles of North Korea
Medium-range ballistic missiles of North Korea
Military equipment introduced in the 2010s